Charles C. Hall (December 23, 1875 – December 26, 1945) was an American football coach. He was the head football coach at Kalamazoo College in Kalamazoo, Michigan, serving for four seasons, from 1897 to 1900, and compiling a record of 21–6–3.

References

1875 births
1945 deaths
Kalamazoo Hornets football coaches
Kalamazoo College alumni
People from Burlington, New Jersey